Leptolalax nyx is a species of frog in the family Megophryidae.

References

nyx
Amphibians described in 2011